Absurdistan is a 2008 German-French comedy film written and directed by Veit Helmer.

It formed part of the World Cinema Dramatic Competition at the 2008 Sundance Film Festival. It was also entered into the 30th Moscow International Film Festival.

Plot
The film is set in a remote and forgotten desert mountain village in the former Soviet Union, and chronicles a standoff between the sexes: the local women decide to withhold sex (a sex strike) until their lazy men fix the pipeline that carries the village's water supply. Young lovers Aya and Temelko are caught up in the argument and Temelko becomes determined to fix the pipeline so he can be with her.

Cast

Kristyna Malérová as Aya
Max Mauff as Temelko
Nino Chkheidze as Aya's Grandmother
Vano Yantbelidze as Dantscho, the shooting gallery owner
Ani Amiridze as Lenora, Dantscho's daughter
Ilko Stefanovski as Guri, Temelko's Father
Assun Planas as Temelko's Mother
Otto Kuhnle as the Barber
Hijran Nasirova as the Barber's Wife
Hendrik Arnst as Landlord
Olga Nefyodova as Landlord's Wife
Adalet Zyadhanov as Policeman
Matanat Atakishiyeva as Policeman's Wife
Azelarab Kaghat as Baker
Michaela Bandi as Baker's Wife
Blagoja Spirkovski-Dzumerko as Cobbler
Dace Bonate as Cobbler's Wife
Elhan Guliyev as Bus Driver
Julietta Koleva as Bus Driver's Wife
Helder Costa as Doctor
Monica Calle as Doctor's Wife
Kazim Abdullayev as Shepherd
Firangiz Babyeva as Shepherd's Wife
László Németh as Postman
Sarah Bensoussan as Postman's Wife
Mubariz Alixanli as Watchmaker
Khatuna Ioseliani as Watchmaker's Wife
Nurradin Guliyev as Beekeeper
Elena Spitsina as Beekeeper's Wife
Radomil Uhlir as Butcher
Suzana Petricevic as Butcher's Wife
Rafiq Azimov as Carpenter
Nelli Cozaru as Carpenter's Wife
Vlasta Velisavljevic as Veteran
Gisela Fritsch as Grandmother (voice)

Production

Helmer started writing the script after reading a 2001 newspaper account of women in the Turkish village of Sirt refusing to accommodate their husbands until they fixed a broken pipeline. He collaborated with Gordan Mihic and Zaza Buadze on the screenplay, receiving funding from Sources2, the Mediterranean Film Institute and the European Commission's MEDIA New Talent programme. Although the film was made on a low budget, Helmer was able to gather a cast of 40 actors from 14 different countries. Most of Absurdistan was filmed on location in Lahıc, Ismailli, Azerbaijan over a nine-week period in summer 2006. As there are no hotels in the village, most of the 90 member crew had to stay with villagers. Additional scenes were filmed in Çayqaraqoyunlu, Shaki and Tbilisi.

Release
Absurdistan had its world premiere at the 2008 Sundance Festival where it was nominated for the Grand Prize in the World Cinema Dramatic category. It released in theatres in Germany on 20 March 2008.

Awards
 2008 Special Award at the Bavarian Film Awards (Veit Helmer)
 2008 Film Award in Gold for Best Production Design at the German Film Awards (Erwin Prib)
 2009 International Fantasy Film Award at Fantasporto (Veit Helmer)
 2009 Grand Prize for Best Feature Film at Mediawave, Hungary (Veit Helmer)

See also
Lysistrata, a play by Aristophanes with a similar plot
The Source

References

External links
 

2008 films
2008 comedy films
German comedy films
Azerbaijani comedy films
2000s Russian-language films
Films shot in Azerbaijan
Films scored by Shigeru Umebayashi
Environmental films
2000s German films